Major General Robert Alexander (October 17, 1863 – August 25, 1941) was a senior United States Army officer. He served in World War I, where he commanded the 77th Infantry Division, in which the famous Lost Battalion served, on the Western Front in 1918.

Early life
Robert Alexander was born in Baltimore, Maryland, on October 17, 1863. His parents were Judge and Mrs. William Alexander. His father had been Justice of the Circuit Court of Baltimore City and the Court of Appeals of the State of Maryland.

Alexander studied law in the offices of J. B. and Edwin H. Brown in Centreville, Maryland. He attained admission to the bar, but decided against a legal career, instead enlisting in the United States Army's 4th Infantry Regiment as a private on April 7, 1886.

Military career
In 1887, he became the first sergeant of his company, and in 1889 received a promotion to second lieutenant.

As he rose through the ranks he took part in the American Indian Wars, served in Puerto Rico during the Spanish–American War. He was with the 11th Infantry in 1901 when it was ordered to the Philippines during the Philippine–American War, and he served at Carigara on the island of Leyte. In 1902, he took part in combat against Filipino insurgents on Leyte and Samar, and in one engagement he was wounded by a bolo. During the Pancho Villa Expedition, Alexander served on the Texas–Mexico. At some point he attended both the United States Army War College and the United States Army Command and General Staff College.

When the United States joined the Allied forces in World War I, Alexander proved his valor and was able to rise through the ranks. He was also given the responsibility of inspector general in the Zone of Communications from November 1917 to February 1918. Alexander was promoted to brigadier general in February 1918 and then to major general in August 1918.

From the headquarters of the 77th Division in France, Alexander was one of the officers who reported on the Lost Battalion incident. A group of around 500 soldiers, in nine companies, had disappeared after going into the Argonne Forest expecting American and French Allied troops to meet them. This had followed an American attack on German forces and, with Major Charles White Whittlesey leading the group, the men found that the French troops had been stalled. As a result, the battalion was cut off by the Germans who surprised them and suffered large losses with only 197 men coming out of the ravine. In the report he states:

In France, he commanded the 41st Division, 63rd Infantry Brigade, and the 77th Division. He commanded the 77th from August 1918 onwards, including during the Meuse–Argonne offensive, where he was awarded the Distinguished Service Cross (DSC) in October for heroism at Grandpré, Ardennes. The medal's citation reads:

He was also awarded the Croix de Guerre (France), two citations and was made a Commander of the Legion of Honor (France).

After the war, which ended on November 11, 1918, he returned to his permanent rank of colonel and commanded the 3rd Field Artillery Brigade.

In 1919, Alexander received the honorary degree of LL.D. from St. John's College of Annapolis, Maryland.

Alexander later commanded the 3rd Division and Fort Lewis, Washington. He retired in 1927 at the rank of major general.

He authored a memoir, 1931's Memories of the World War, 1917–1918. Also in 1931, Alexander received an honorary LL.D. from the College of Puget Sound.

In 1933, Alexander was a delegate to the Washington state convention that ratified the Twenty-first Amendment to the United States Constitution. He was a candidate for chairman of the convention but after a deadlock he withdrew in favor of a compromise choice. On the ratification question, Alexander was in the majority, which voted to enact the Twenty-first amendment by a vote of 94 to 4.

Personal life
In 1892, Alexander married Mollie Augur Thomas (1871–1953), the daughter of Brigadier General Earl D. Thomas. They were the parents of two sons, both of whom served in the army. William Dennison (1893–1978) attained the rank of  colonel and Robert Jr. became a lieutenant colonel.

Alexander was active in freemasonry. In 1931, he attained the 33rd degree of the Scottish Rite.

He died in Manhattan on August 25, 1941, and is buried at Arlington National Cemetery, in Arlington, Virginia.

Effective dates of promotion
The dates and ranks of Alexander's promotions were:

 Private and Sergeant, Company G, 4th United States Infantry, April 7, 1886 – January 29, 1890
 Second Lieutenant, December 17, 1889
 First Lieutenant, January 7, 1897
 Captain, October 2, 1899
 Major, March 11, 1911
 Lieutenant Colonel, July 1, 1916
 Colonel, August 26, 1917
 Brigadier General (temporary), February 9, 1918
 Major General (temporary), August 26, 1918
 Colonel, July 31, 1919
 Brigadier General (permanent), April 30, 1921
 Major General (permanent), August 26, 1927
 Major General (retired), October 17, 1927

References

Bibliography

Further reading

External links

|-

1863 births
1941 deaths
United States Army Infantry Branch personnel
American military personnel of the Spanish–American War
United States Army generals of World War I
Burials at Arlington National Cemetery
Military personnel from Baltimore
Recipients of the Distinguished Service Cross (United States)
Recipients of the Croix de Guerre 1914–1918 (France)
United States Army personnel of the Indian Wars
United States Army generals
Commandeurs of the Légion d'honneur
American military personnel of the Philippine–American War
United States Army Command and General Staff College alumni
United States Army War College alumni